Blagodatny is a rural locality (a khutor) in Lychakskoye Rural Settlement, Frolovsky District, Volgograd Oblast, Russia. The population was counted at 50 people in 2010.

Geography 
Dudachensky is the nearest rural locality.

References 

Rural localities in Frolovsky District